Stefan Mittnik is a German economist, currently holds the Chair of Financial Econometrics at the  Ludwig Maximilian University of Munich. He is a fellow of the Center for Financial Studies and known for his work on financial market and financial risk modeling as well as macroeconometrics. He is also a co-founder of the German-British robo-advisor Scalable Capital.

Biography
Stefan Mittnik received a degree in business and engineering in 1981 from the Technical University Berlin in Germany. He continued his studies in the UK, earning an MA in development economics at the University of Sussex, and the U.S., earning his Ph.D. in economics and applied mathematics from Washington University in St. Louis in 1987.

Research
Mittnik's main research contributions have been in econometrics, time series analysis, finance, and risk management. Influenced by Benoit Mandelbrot, who was the first to criticize financial economists for relying on the normal distribution and ignoring fat tails in asset returns, he has developed methods for more realistic financial risk modeling, portfolio optimization and option pricing.

References

External links
 Website at LMU 
 IDEAS RePEc page
 Deutsche Digitale Bibliothek (DDB)

German economists
Washington University in St. Louis alumni
Academic staff of the University of Kiel
1954 births
Living people